Yohandris Andújar de la Cruz (born 5 July 1990) is a Dominican sprinter. He competed in the men's 4 × 100 metres relay at the 2016 Summer Olympics.

References

External links

1990 births
Living people
Dominican Republic male sprinters
Olympic athletes of the Dominican Republic
Athletes (track and field) at the 2016 Summer Olympics
Central American and Caribbean Games medalists in athletics